Kohtla-Järve Spordikeskuse staadion is a multi-use stadium in Kohtla-Järve, Estonia. It has mostly been used for football matches and has been the home ground for FC Lootus Kohtla-Järve and Ida-Virumaa FC Alliance. The stadium used to hold 780 to 2,200 people, but the grandstand was demolished in 2020.

Estonia national team matches 
Kohtla-Järve has hosted the Estonia national football team once, in 1998.

References

External links
 World Stadiums

Football venues in Estonia
Kohtla-Järve
Buildings and structures in Ida-Viru County